M. arabica  may refer to:
 Medicago arabica, the spotted medick, spotted burclover, heart clover, a flowering plant species native to the Mediterranean basin
 Miomantis arabica, a praying mantis species

Synonyms
 Mimosa arabica, a synonym for Acacia nilotica, the gum arabic tree, babul, Egyptian thorn or prickly acacia, a plant species native to Africa and the Indian subcontinent

See also
 Arabica (disambiguation)